illScarlett is the fifth studio album by Canadian ska band illScarlett, released on September 2, 2014. The first single from the album is titled "My Money" and was released May 21, 2013 on iTunes.

Track listing

Personnel
 Alex Norman — guitar and vocals
 Swavek Piorkowski — drums
 Will Marr — guitar
 CJ Hinds — bass

References

IllScarlett albums
2014 albums
Universal Music Canada albums